The 2020–21 season is Kitchee's 42nd season in the top-tier division in Hong Kong football. Kitchee has competed in the Premier League, Senior Challenge Shield, FA Cup, Sapling Cup and AFC Champions League this season.

Squad

First Team
As of 21 June 2021

 

 
 
 FP
 FP

 FP
 FP
 FP
 FP

 LP 
 

 LP 
 LP

 FP

 
 
 

Remarks:
LP These players are considered as local players in Hong Kong domestic football competitions.
FP These players are registered as foreign players.

Transfers

Transfers in

Transfers out

Loans Out

Club officials

Club Senior staff

Coaching staff

Competitions

Hong Kong Premier League

Table

Results by round

Results summary

League Matches 
On 2 November 2020, the fixtures for the forthcoming season were announced.

Hong Kong Senior Challenge Shield

Hong Kong Sapling Cup

Group stage

Hong Kong FA Cup

Group stage

AFC Champions League

Group stage

Remarks

References

Kitchee SC seasons
Hong Kong football clubs 2020–21 season